Kacee Carlisle (born February 11, 1980) is a female professional wrestler. She has wrestled throughout the independent circuit for many promotions including Women Superstars Uncensored, National Wrestling League, World Xtreme Wrestling, and the National Wrestling Alliance (NWA). She has held the NWA World Women's Championship one time and is the current Queen of Valkyrie.

Professional wrestling career 
Carlisle knew she wanted to be a professional wrestler since she was eight years old. She admired female wrestler Sherri Martel. At an independent show in 1997, Carlisle met wrestler Shorty Smalls. He agreed to train her as a manager and wrestler. She debuted as a manager for Smalls in 1998. Carlisle worked sparingly until 2003, when she debuted for the National Wrestling League/House of Pain Wrestling Federation. She wrestled in her first match on July 30, 2005, against Krissy Vaine at a World Xtreme Wrestling (WXW) show as a last minute substitute for a sick wrestler. In 2006, she wrestled in WXW's Elite 8 Tournament where she lost in the final round to Mercedes Martinez.  There was one very memorable match that Kacee Carlisle had with Cindy Rogers.  During this encounter, Cindy Rogers was wearing spandex.

In February 2011, Carlisle participated in TNA Gut Check, a recruitment program for Total Nonstop Action Wrestling, but she did not earn a contract with the promotion.

Carlisle defeated Tasha Simone on October 20, 2012, to win the NWA World Women's Championship. She later lost the title to Barbi Hayden on January 25, 2014.

On October 24, 2014, Carlisle defeated Sumie Sakai at VALKYRIE III: Queen's Road to become the inaugural Queen of VALKYRIE for VALKYRIE Women's Professional Wrestling.

On October 25, 2014, Carlisle defeated Sara Feeny to become the inaugural 1CW Women's Champion for First State Championship Wrestling. On December 13, 2014, she successfully defended the title against Jessie Kay.

Personal life 
Carlisle grew up in Washington D.C. Carlisle ran for her high school team. She also lived in Manassas, Virginia, where she worked as an office manager. Her interests include animals, traveling, and photography.

Championships and accomplishments 
 Adrenaline Championship Wrestling
 ACW Women's Championship (2 time, current)
 Brew City Wrestling
 BCW Women's Championship (1 time, current)
 Bruiser Wrestling Federation
 BWF Ladies Championship (3 times)
 Dangerous Adrenaline Wrestling Gladiators
 WWGP Women's Championship (1 time, current)
 Dynamite Championship Wrestling
 DCW Divas of Dynamite Women's Championship (2 times)
 DCW Divas of Dynamite Tournament (2014)
 DCW Heavyweight Championship (1 time)
 First State Championship Wrestling
 1CW Women's Championship (1 time)
 Elite Pro Wrestling Alliance
 EPWA Women's Championship (2 times, current)
 Lucha Pride Pro Wrestling
 Lucha Pride Pro Wrestling Women's Championship (1 time, current; inaugural)
 Modern Vintage Wrestling
 MVW Women's Championship (1 time, current)
 National Wrestling Alliance
 NWA World Women's Championship (1 time)
 National Wrestling League
 NWL/HoPWF Women's Champion (1 time)
 Professional Girl Wrestling Association
 Newcomer of the Year (2007)
 Pro Wrestling Entertainment
 PWE Ladies Championship (1 time)
 Pro Wrestling Illustrated
 Ranked No. 7 of the best 50 female singles wrestlers in the PWI Female 50 in 2013
 Ultimate Championship Wrestling
 UCW Women's Championship (1 time)
 Valkyrie Women's Professional Wrestling
 Queen of Valkyrie (1 time, current)
 World Xtreme Wrestling
 WXW Women's Championship (1 time)
 WXW Diamond Division Championship (1 time)

References

External links 
Kacee Carlisle profile at GLORY Wrestling.com

American female professional wrestlers
Living people
Professional wrestlers from Washington, D.C.
1980 births
People from Manassas, Virginia
21st-century American women
21st-century professional wrestlers
20th-century professional wrestlers
NWA World Women's Champions